The University of Arkansas Razorbacks baseball team is a member of the National Collegiate Athletic Association (NCAA) and the Southeastern Conference (SEC), and is coached by Dave Van Horn. The program started in 1897, and is in its 100th season of play (75th consecutive) in 2022. Arkansas is one of only four schools in the SEC to turn a profit from its baseball program in recent years, along with SEC Western division rivals LSU, Mississippi State and Ole Miss.

The Razorbacks have been to 32 NCAA tournaments and eleven College World Series: 1979, 1985, 1987, 1989, 2004, 2009, 2012, 2015, 2018, 2019, 2022.

Venue

The Razorbacks play baseball home games in Baum-Walker Stadium at George Cole Field, which holds 11,749. Arkansas was the first program in the nation to have an average attendance over 8,000 for the course of the season. Baum Stadium has hosted NCAA regionals in 1999, 2004, 2006, 2007, 2010, 2017, 2018, 2019, and 2021. The Arkansas baseball team also hosted an NCAA Super Regional in 2004 against Florida State, in 2015 against Missouri State, in 2018 against South Carolina, in 2019 against Ole Miss, and again in 2021 against North Carolina State. One of the games in the 2015 Super Regional series against Missouri State set the all-time stadium attendance mark at 12,167. The first game of the South Carolina Super Regional series had 11, 722 in attendance making it the 3rd highest attended game in Baum stadium history.  Baum stadium was voted top ballpark in collegiate baseball by Baseball America, 20 years after claiming the top spot in a 1998 poll.

In 2007, Arkansas led the nation in attendance, with 8,069 attendees per game, over 700 more per game than second-place LSU. Mississippi State, another SEC school, was third with an average of 6,795 per game.

Before Baum Stadium was built, the Razorbacks played on the original George Cole Field from 1975 to 1995, named for former all-conference quarterback, shortstop and athletic director George Cole.  The field was next to John McDonnell Field, home of the outdoor track and field team, and has since been turned into the practice field for the football team.

History
Arkansas first fielded a baseball team from 1897 to 1930.  The modern era of Razorbacks baseball began in 1947, under Deke Brackett.  Bill Ferrell led the team from 1950 to 1965, and Wayne Robbins took over from 1966 to 1969.

In 1970, Cole hired 28-year-old Norm DeBriyn after another man took the job but resigned after only one day.  DeBriyn inherited a program that played at a dilapidated stadium at the Washington County Fairgrounds, and whose paperwork was contained in a single manila folder.  He immediately set about upgrading the program.  Within three years, he had the Razorbacks in the NCAA tournament for the first time in school history.  He then persuaded athletic director Frank Broyles to build a new on-campus stadium, George Cole Field. Arkansas' baseball program has won five conference championships, two in the Southwest Conference in 1989 and 1990, and three in the Southeastern Conference in 1999, 2004, and 2021. They have also won two conference tournament titles, the first in 1985 as a member of the SWC, the second in 2021 in the SEC. In addition to those championships, the Razorbacks have also won seven SEC West Division championships in 1999, 2004, 2007, 2011, 2018, 2019, and 2021. In Arkansas' eleven College World Series appearances they have finished as national runners-up twice, in 1979 and 2018.

1979 College World Series

DeBriyn's 10th team put the Razorbacks on the national map.  The Razorbacks won 49 games, lost 15, and finished second in the Southwest Conference (SWC). The Hogs defeated George Washington, Florida, and Delaware twice to move out of the East Regional (played at Seminole Stadium in Tallahassee, Florida). The Razorbacks then went to Omaha and defeated Pepperdine, 5–4 and an Arizona Wildcats club, with a young Terry Francona, 10–3. A match-up with SWC champion Texas loomed next for the Razorbacks. The Hogs had gone 1–4 against the Longhorns up to this point in the season. The Razorbacks prevailed, 9–4, and earned a contest with Cal State Fullerton for a championship. Texas was eliminated. Arkansas lost twice to the Titans, 13–10, and 2–1, to give the trophy to Cal State Fullerton. Freshman Kevin McReynolds was named to the all-tournament team as an outfielder, along with Steve Krueger at pitcher, Larry Wallace at shortstop, and Marc Brumble as an outfielder.

1985 College World Series

Arkansas came into the South regional hot winning twelve straight games (last loss against fellow CWS team Mississippi State), and winning the SWC tournament with the help of tourney-MVP Dave Patterson. A 20–13 victory over Eastern Kentucky started things off on the right foot for the Hogs. Wins against George Mason, hometown FSU, and Georgia Tech would push the Hogs to their second College World Series.

Arkansas arrived in Omaha in as dramatic fashion as they left it. The Diamond Hogs defeated the Gamecocks of South Carolina in a 14 inning affair, 1–0, but Arkansas would lose to Mississippi State three days later, and fall to the loser's bracket. Facing elimination, the Razorbacks crushed Stanford 10–4, eliminating the Cardinal from the College World Series. Now a win away from the Championship series with Miami (Fl), Arkansas had to face Southwest Conference rival Texas.

Said Razorback third baseman Jeff King of Texas, "We figured we would meet them again." The Hogs were 4–1 against the Longhorns in 1985, including two wins in the Southwest Conference Tournament. Arkansas lead the game 7–0, but the Longhorns battled back and sent the game to extra innings. Texas' Bill Bates hit a leadoff triple in the bottom of the tenth inning with the score tied 7–7. Arkansas coach Norm DeBriyn opted to intentionally walk the bases full and pull the infield in. Doug Hodo then hit a single past the infielders, allowing Bates to score and the Horns to move on, 8–7 in ten innings. The situation was oddly similar to the last time the Hogs reached the College World Series, except Texas was 4–1 against the Hogs in 1979 (including two SWC tournament wins), and Arkansas prevailed in the 1979 CWS match up.

Freshman third baseman Jeff King and junior outfielder Ralph Kraus were named to the All-College World Series team.

1987 College World Series

Arkansas was 51–16 in 1987, and finished in fifth place at the CWS. The Hogs finished second in both the SWC regular season and postseason tournament. The Regional was played in Huntsville, Alabama, and the Razorbacks defeated Middle Tennessee, West Virginia, and Clemson (twice) in order to play in Omaha. Texas, who Arkansas had gone a lowly 1–4 against during the season and now was ranked #1 nationally, loomed in a Rosenblatt Stadium showdown.

Texas defeated Arkansas, 13–6, but Arkansas rebounded with a win against future SEC foe Georgia, eliminating the Bulldogs. Georgia was led by pitcher Derek Lilliquist (14–2), who had 19 HR and 60 RBI entering Omaha. Another future SEC opponent was on the horizon, this time in the form of Tigers from LSU. The Tigers came out on top, 5–2, but were eliminated two days later, with Texas eliminated a day later.

1989 College World Series

Ten years after the successful 1979 campaign, the Razorbacks were again headed to Omaha. First, the 51–16 Razorbacks played their way through the Northwest Regional, losing first to Le Moyne before defeating George Washington, Illinois, Arizona State, and Le Moyne to move to the College World Series.

Once in the College World Series, the Diamond Hogs met Wichita State. The Shockers had actually been defeated by the Razorbacks 5–1 in Fayetteville, which was the Razorbacks' first game of the season. Arkansas lost 3–1 on June 2, and had to stave off elimination against North Carolina. The Tar Heels were eliminated, and Arkansas had another shot at the Shockers, who had lost to Florida State and was now fighting to remain in Omaha, as one more loss would eliminate them.

Wichita State defeated Norm DeBriyn's Razorbacks, 8–4, eliminating them. The finish was good for fifth place in the CWS. Wichita State would go on to win the National Championship, fighting off elimination three times more. Six of the 11 all-CWS team were members of the Wichita State Shockers, including Eric Wedge. Arkansas Razorbacks outfielder Troy Eklund was elected to the All-American team.

2004
Arkansas won the SEC Western Division, a portion of the SEC crown, and visited the College World Series again in 2004.

2004 SEC tournament

The Hogs were picked to finish last in the SEC, but instead was the #1 seed in the SEC Tournament. The Diamond Hogs lost to Luke Hochevar and the Volunteers of Tennessee, 6–8 in 13 innings. Kyle Norrid of Tennessee hit a three-run double in the 12th inning, but the Hogs returned with four straight singles to keep the game going. Chris Kemp hit a game-winning double the next inning, and Craig Cobb retired the Razorbacks to earn the save. The game was the third of the day to extend into extra innings. The Hogs then defeated Ole Miss and Tennessee by the counts of 4–3 and 4–1 respectively, before losing to South Carolina, 2–3. Arkansas went into the ninth down 3–0, and loaded the bases with no outs. Jake Dugger drove in a run with a single. Following a strikeout, Brett Hagedorn added to the Razorbacks score with a sacrifice fly. Scott Hode grounded out for out number three, and the rally fell short. The Gamecocks would win the championship by defeating Vanderbilt. Arkansas finished third in the SEC tournament.

2004 College World Series

The Razorbacks began play in their home stadium in the Fayetteville Regional. Arkansas defeated Le Moyne first, but lost to Wichita State 4–1. The Razorbacks had not seen the last of the Shockers, though, and after a 10–7 win over Missouri, defeated them two times on June 6, 2004, to advance to the Super Regionals.

Arkansas had to play Florida State twice to move on to Omaha, but the games were again at Baum Stadium. The Diamond Hogs prevailed, 7–4 and 4–2 and went on to Omaha.

Arkansas was an eight seed in 2004, and for the fourth time in five Hog appearances, Arkansas' first game in Omaha was against the Texas Longhorns. #1 Texas prevailed 13–2, and the Razorbacks were one loss from elimination. The Arizona Wildcats would bump the Razorbacks from Rosenblatt Stadium in their next game, 7–2.

2009 College World Series

Arkansas began hot in 2009, starting the year at 10–2 including back-to-back wins over #1 Arizona State that set Baum Stadium attendance records. The Hogs luck changed entering SEC play, as they dropped series against Vanderbilt, Georgia, and LSU, and were swept by Alabama and Ole Miss to end the year. Limping into the 2009 SEC baseball tournament, the Hogs defeated Florida twice, but were bumped from the tournament by Vanderbilt. The Razorbacks were the #2 seed in the Norman Regional, hosted by the Oklahoma Sooners.

The Hogs defeated Washington State in game 1 in Norman, setting up a match up with #9 Oklahoma, who the Hogs had beaten at home a month earlier on a Brett Eibner walk-off bases-loaded walk. Arkansas collected 20 hits in a 17–6 win over the Sooners, setting up super regional berth with another win. Razorback Andy Wilkins went 5–5 in the following game with two doubles, two home runs, four runs scored and five RBI in an 11–0 rout. The win pushed the Hogs to a meeting with Florida State in Dick Howser Stadium.

The Hogs last met Florida State in the 2004 Fayetteville Super Regional, with the Hogs advancing to Omaha. Arkansas scored five runs in the last three innings to win game 1, and Andrew Darr propelled the Hogs to the College World Series on his two-run walk-off double in the bottom of the ninth.

The Razorbacks opened the College World Series in game 1 against #1 national seed Cal State Fullerton. Dallas Keuchel pitched well, with Zack Cox and Andy Wilkins both homering in a resounding 10–6 win. The win set a rematch with LSU, who had beaten Arkansas in a hard-fought series earlier in the year. LSU got a first-inning home run from pitcher Brett Eibner, and the Hogs bats fell silent in a 9–1 loss. Both fighting for their tournament lives, Arkansas met Virginia in an elimination game. The Razorbacks offense was again quiet, and the Hogs were down to their last strike when Brett Eibner homered to keep the Razorbacks in Omaha. The Hogs would prevail after another timely Andrew Darr double in the tenth inning. A rematch with LSU sat on the horizon, and the drained Arkansas pitching staff struggled. Closer Stephen Richards started the game for the Hogs, who were losing 4–0 by the third inning. After an error and a wild pitch, the Razorbacks gave up runs in six separate innings, and lost 14–5. The Hogs finished tied with Arizona State (who Arkansas defeated twice in the regular season) for third place.

2012 College World Series

Arkansas began the 2012 season with high expectations, including a consensus top ten ranking and D. J. Baxendale, Nolan Sanburn, Dominic Ficociello, and Ryne Stanek receiving preseason All-America honors. The team began the season playing well in non-conference games, and finished with a 16–14 SEC record. After a quick two losses at the SEC tournament, it was announced the Hogs would play in the Houston Regional, hosted by Rice University. Arkansas defeated the Sam Houston State Bearkats twice and Rice once to advance to the Waco, Texas, Super Regional against Baylor. The Razorbacks dropped the first game to Baylor, 8–1. Facing elimination, Arkansas won game 2 after consecutive hit by pitches with the bases loaded gave the Hogs the tying and winning runs. Arkansas won game 3 when Jake Wise drove in Brian Anderson with a double in the 10th inning, pushing across the game's only run and sending the Hogs to Omaha.

Arkansas won their first game of the 2012 College World Series, an 8–1 victory over Kent State Golden Flashes. D. J. Baxendale pitched into the seventh inning, with Joe Serrano, Brian Anderson, Bo Bigham, and Jake Wise all collecting multiple hits.  Two nights later the Razorbacks faced SEC foe and two-time defending champion the South Carolina Gamecocks, who came into the game with a 22-game postseason win streak.  A Dominic Ficociello RBI in the first inning gave Arkansas a 1–0 lead, as they never trailed, winning a 2–1 pitcher's duel.  Stanek pitched six innings, allowing just one run on three hits.  Reliever Barrett Astin pitched the final three innings allowing no runs, and just one hit.

2015 College World Series

Arkansas was not expected to make it to the College World Series in 2015, especially after a slow start to the season left the Razorbacks sitting at .500 heading into April. But the Razorbacks caught fire behind SEC and national player of the year Andrew Benintendi and won both the Stillwater Regional and Fayetteville Super Regional to advance to Omaha for the eighth time and fourth time under Van Horn.

In the first game, Arkansas got a stellar pitching performance from Trey Killian, but normally lights-out closer Zach Jackson didn't have his best stuff and Virginia came back and forced the Razorbacks into an elimination game, beating them 5–3.

Arkansas then faced No. 5 national seed Miami, and fell behind 2–0 when Jacob Heyward hit a 2-run shot off reliever Jackson Lowery, who had just been inserted for Keaton McKinney. The Razorbacks rallied twice to tie the game at 2–2 and 3–3, but lost 4–3 when Heyward hit a walk-off single. It was the first time since 2004 that they failed to win a game in Omaha.

2018 College World Series
The Razorbacks entered Omaha with a 44–19 record, co-champions of the SEC West with Ole Miss, and having won the Fayetteville Regional and Super Regional at home in Baum Stadium. The team set a school record for home wins, going 34–4 at Baum. Beginning the year as a top ten team, the Razorbacks never left that spot throughout the season. Arkansas previously played four of the other seven teams in Omaha, compiling a 4–5 record against them prior to the CWS.

Arkansas defeated Texas in its opening game 11–5 behind pitcher Blaine Knight, who improved to 13–0 on the year. A three-hour rain delay marred the contest. It then went on to beat Texas Tech 7–4 in a game pushed back a day because of weather, and then eliminated defending national champion Florida 5–2 to earn a spot in the championship series against Oregon State. Arkansas won the first game of the championship series 4–1, but Oregon State ultimately claimed the title with a comeback 5–3 win in game two, thanks in large part to a dropped foul ball by Arkansas with two outs in the 9th inning. If an Arkansas player had caught the foul (there were three players in the area), the Razorbacks would have won game two and claimed their first national championship. The Oregon State batter hit a home run two pitches later to win the game, and the Beavers would win decisively in game three, 5-0. The game two loss is considered one of the most heart-breaking losses in program history.

Postseason appearances

Conference Tournaments

NCAA tournament

Source: Razorbacks baseball History in NCAA and Conference Postseason Tournaments

Conference affiliations
Southwest Conference: 1922–1926, 1974–1992
Southeastern Conference: 1993–present

Source:

Alumni

Golden Spikes Award & Dick Howser Trophy

Arkansas has produced two winners of the Golden Spikes Award and Dick Howser Trophy, bestowed annually to the best amateur baseball player in the United States. It was created by USA Baseball and is sponsored by the Major League Baseball Players Association.

Andrew Benintendi – 2015
Kevin Kopps – 2021

All-Americans

The Razorbacks have produced 31 All-Americans. Jeff King, Kevin McReynolds, Nick Schmidt, Phillip Stidham, and David Walling have earned the honors twice.

 Greg D'Alexander – 1990
 Andrew Benintendi – 2015
 Isaiah Campbell - 2019
 Zack Cox – 2010
 Matt Cronin - 2019
 Brett Eibner – 2010
 Troy Eklund – 1989
 Christian Franklin - 2021
 Charlie Isaacson – 1999
 Jack Kenley - 2019
 Jeff King – 1985, 1986
 Heston Kjerstad - 2020
 Blaine Knight – 2018
 Kevin Kopps - 2021
 Ralph Kraus – 1986
 Steve Krueger – 1980
 Mike Loggins – 1985
 Tim Lollar – 1978
 Ryan Lundquist – 1997
 Kevin McReynolds – 1980, 1981
 Kenderick Moore – 1996
 Matt Reynolds – 2012
 Ronn Reynolds – 1979
 Nick Schmidt – 2006, 2007
 Carson Shaddy - 2018
 Andy Skeels – 1987
 Ryne Stanek – 2013
 Phillip Stidham – 1990, 1991
 Jess Todd – 2007
 David Walling – 1998, 1999
 Patrick Wicklander - 2021

Source: Arkansas Razorbacks baseball All-Americans

Freshman All-Americans
The Razorbacks have also produced 24 Freshmen All-Americans. 

 Barrett Astin – 2011
 Matt Carnes – 1995
 Zack Cox – 2009
 Jake Dugger – 2004
 Brett Eibner – 2008
 Matt Erickson – 1995
 James Ewing – 2006
 Dominic Ficociello – 2011
 Dominic Fletcher – 2017
 Danny Hamblin – 2004
 Charlie Isaacson – 1999
 Jeff King – 1984
 Brian Kirby – 1998
 Heston Kjerstad – 2018
 Casey Martin – 2018
 Keaton McKinney – 2015
 Robert Moore - 2020, 2021
 Connor Noland - 2019
 Nolan Sanburn – 2011
 Nick Schmidt – 2005
 Shaun Seibert – 2005
 Tyler Spoon – 2013
 Phillip Stidham – 1989
 Cayden Wallace - 2021

Source: Arkansas Razorbacks baseball Freshmen All-Americans

Major Leaguers
54 former Razorbacks have played at least one game in the Majors.

Source: Razorbacks baseball-Razorbacks in the Majors

See also
List of NCAA Division I baseball programs

External links
ArkansasRazorbacks.com – Official Website

References

 
Baseball in Arkansas